Benjamin Franklin "Frank" Cheatham (October 20, 1820 – September 4, 1886) was a Tennessee planter, California gold miner, and a general in the Confederate States Army during the American Civil War. He served in the Army of Tennessee, inflicting many casualties on Gen. Sherman at Kennesaw Mountain, Georgia, but taking the blame for General Schofield's escape at Spring Hill, Tennessee – a major factor in the Confederate defeat at Franklin, Tennessee.

Early life and education
Cheatham was born in Nashville, Tennessee on a plantation called Westover, which in its prime consisted of three thousand acres (12 km2). He was born into two of the most prominent families of the middle Tennessee elite of the slave society. His mother was descended from General James Robertson, the founder of Nashville and "father" of Middle Tennessee, who came from Virginia. The Cheathams had been in middle Tennessee for two generations and become established as plantation owners, lawyers, doctors and mayors of the city.

Antebellum years
At the start of the Mexican–American War, Cheatham joined the 1st Tennessee Infantry Regiment as a captain and finished the war having been promoted to Colonel of the 3rd Tennessee. He moved to California in 1849 for the Gold Rush, but returned to Tennessee in 1853.

He managed his plantation and served as a brigadier general in the Tennessee militia.

Civil War
Cheatham joined the Confederate States Army as a brigadier general on May 9, 1861, from Stockton, California, becoming one of at least four generals from California who served the Confederacy in the war.

Cheatham was brigade commander in the Western District of Department Number Two, under Maj. Gen. Leonidas Polk. His first test in the war was in Missouri on November 7 at the Battle of Belmont, leading three regiments in Brig. Gen. Gideon J. Pillow's division against Union Brig. Gen. Ulysses S. Grant, also in his first Civil War combat. In December, Cheatham and his division received the thanks of the Confederate Congress "for the desperate courage they exhibited in sustaining for several hours, and under most disadvantageous circumstances an attack by a force of the enemy greatly superior to their own, both in numbers and appointments; and for the skill and gallantry by which they converted what at first threatened so much disaster, into a triumphant victory."

Cheatham was promoted to major general, on March 10, 1862, and was appointed commander of the 2nd Division, First Corps, Army of Mississippi. He led his division at the Battle of Shiloh and was wounded, although it is unclear whether this occurred on April 6 or April 7, 1862. General Braxton Bragg became commander of the Army (soon to be designated the Army of Tennessee) and Cheatham served under him at Perryville and Stones River. At the latter battle, Cheatham performed sluggishly, ordering piecemeal assaults; observers claimed he had been drinking heavily and was unable to command his units effectively. However, Pvt. Sam Watkins, author of Company Aytch, claims to have personally witnessed Cheatham leading a charge on the Wilkerson Turnpike during the battle, indicating that he performed gallantly during that part of the battle, at least.

Cheatham continued as a division commander under Bragg at the Battle of Chickamauga and, following that rare Confederate victory in the West, and in the battles around Chattanooga, including Missionary Ridge, where Bragg was defeated by Grant. He helped block the Union Army in the final hours of the battle.

In 1864, Cheatham fought well in the Atlanta Campaign under General Joseph E. Johnston, and later Lt. Gen. John Bell Hood, inflicting heavy casualties on William T. Sherman's Union Army at the Battle of Kennesaw Mountain, and was wounded at the Battle of Ezra Church. He took over command of Hood's corps when Hood was elevated to command the army on July 18, and led his corps in the battles around Atlanta.

Cheatham's most famous service came as a corps commander under Hood in the Franklin-Nashville Campaign. He was engaged in all the major battles of the campaign, receiving notoriety when the Union Army under Maj. Gen. John M. Schofield was able to slip by him and escape from the Battle of Spring Hill, which foiled Hood's plan and led to the disastrous Confederate defeat at Franklin the next day. Hood accused Cheatham of dereliction of duty and the enmity between them lasted for the rest of their lives. Hood's recently discovered papers, which include numerous letters based on supposition and hearsay from high-level generals, fail to confirm that Cheatham refused to execute Hood's orders to block the turnpike and that he was against launching a night attack. After the collapse of Hood's army at Nashville, Cheatham joined Johnston's motley command for the Carolinas Campaign as a division commander, the highest position this small army could justify. He surrendered to General Sherman in North Carolina in April 1865.

During the war, Cheatham rode the horse Old Isham, named after Isham Harris, the Confederate Governor of Tennessee.

Postbellum life

Marriage and family
Shortly after the war, he married in his 40s for the first time, to Anna Bell Robertson of North Carolina (she was no relation to his line of Robertsons). She was the sister of one of his war-time aides. They had five children together: Benjamin Franklin Jr., Patton Robertson, Joseph Johnston, Medora Cheatham Hodgson, and Alice.

Their son Benjamin Franklin Cheatham, Jr. (1867–1944) was a major general in the U.S. Army, serving with distinction in the Spanish–American War and World War I. He served as quartermaster general from 1926 to 1930. During his tenure in the latter position, he supervised landscaping improvements to Arlington National Cemetery, including restoration of the Lee Mansion and the building of the Tomb of the Unknowns. He is buried at Arlington.

Their daughter Medora married Telfair Hodgson Jr., the treasurer of Sewanee: The University of the South and a developer of Belle Meade, Tennessee, whose own father, Telfair Hodgson, was Sewanee's third vice chancellor.

Work life
After the war, Cheatham declined an offer of Federal civil service employment from President Grant.

He was an unsuccessful candidate for the United States House of Representatives in 1872. He served for four years as the appointed superintendent of a Tennessee state prison. He was appointed postmaster of Nashville (1885–1886). He died in Nashville and is buried there in Mount Olivet Cemetery.

Legacy and honors
After the war, a camp of the Association of Confederate Soldiers Tennessee Division was named the Frank Cheatham Bivouac in honor of the Confederate general.

See also

 List of American Civil War generals (Confederate)

Notes

References
 Eicher, John H., and David J. Eicher. Civil War High Commands. Stanford, CA: Stanford University Press, 2001. .
 Evans, Clement A., ed. Confederate Military History: A Library of Confederate States History. 12 vols. Atlanta: Confederate Publishing Company, 1899. . Biography of Cheatham.
 Losson, Christopher. Tennessee's Forgotten Warriors: Frank Cheatham and His Confederate Division. Knoxville: University of Tennessee Press, 1989. .
 Warner, Ezra J. Generals in Gray: Lives of the Confederate Commanders. Baton Rouge: Louisiana State University Press, 1959. .

External links

 Civil War Home biography
  
 MG Benjamin Franklin Cheatham (son) at ArlingtonCemetery.net, an unofficial website

1820 births
1886 deaths
Politicians from Nashville, Tennessee
Confederate States Army major generals
National Guard (United States) colonels
American military personnel of the Mexican–American War
People of Tennessee in the American Civil War
Burials at Mount Olivet Cemetery (Nashville)
Tennessee National Guard personnel
Cheatham family
Tennessee postmasters
People of the California Gold Rush